also known as  in German and  "maccheroni alla pastora" in Italian, is a dish originating from South Tyrol, consisting of penne rigate,  cream, peas, champignon mushrooms and cooked ham, topped with grated parmesan cheese, typically served in mountain huts.
There are several ways of preparing Hirtenmakkaroni, for example the ragù can be replaced with sausages.

References

Bibliography
 

Tyrolean culture
Pasta dishes
Macaroni dishes